Sox Harrison Stadium is a stadium in Edinboro, Pennsylvania, on the campus of Pennsylvania Western University Edinboro (PennWest Edinboro). It is home to the Edinboro Fighting Scots of the Pennsylvania State Athletic Conference. The stadium is named for B. Regis "Sox" Harrison, who served as the head football coach at Edinboro from 1926 to 1938 and 1941-42 before being inducted into the university's Athletic Hall of Fame. The stadium was officially opened in 1965.

It underwent several renovations in the late 1990s. A new grandstand was added to the visiting side of the stadium in 1997, increasing the capacity by 2,500. A press box was also added, along with a locker room and training facilities. In 1999, the stadium received a new sound system and improved handicapped access.

The stadium then got a major facelift in 2007, when the university added a Sportexe artificial surface, lighting to allow for night games, and a new scoreboard at the south end-zone. The seating capacity was brought to 6,000 while the stadium itself being able to accommodate plenty of standing-room only spectators as well. The Edinboro Fighting Scots football team played their first-ever night game at the stadium on September 20, 2008, against California University of PA, a 35–31 loss in front of an announced crowd of 7,213.

The stadium also serves as a neutral site for PIAA high school playoff football games.

References

College football venues
Edinboro Fighting Scots football
Sports venues in Pennsylvania